Makron may refer to:

 A town in Madhya Pradesh, India
 Makron (vase painter), Greek red-figure vase painter
 Makron, a boss character in Quake (series)

See also
 Macron (disambiguation)